Sedera Mathieu Randriamparany (born May 3, 1990) is a Malagasy footballer. He currently plays for JS Saint-Pierroise in Réunion.

1990 births
Living people
Malagasy footballers
Madagascar international footballers
Expatriate footballers in Réunion
Association football defenders
Ajesaia players